Stewie Griffin: The Untold Story is a 2005 American adult animated direct-to-video adventure comedy film set in the Family Guy fictional universe. Released on September 27, 2005, the film's main plot point concerns Stewie Griffin, following a near death experience, trying to find who he thinks is his real father after seeing the man on TV. He travels to San Francisco, only to find that the man is him from the future.  The DVD contains commentaries and a sneak peek preview of the American Dad! Volume 1 DVD.

Fox eventually aired the film as three separate episodes for the Family Guy season 4 finale in May 21, 2006. Fox had several scenes cut out and other scenes altered to make it only 66 minutes long. The shortened and separated versions of the three segments – "Stewie B. Goode" (written by Gary Janetti and Chris Sheridan), "Bango Was His Name, Oh!" (written by Alex Borstein), and "Stu and Stewie's Excellent Adventure" (written by Steve Callaghan) – were aired on May 21, 2006.

Plot
The film opens with the premiere of the film, with celebrities such as Drew Barrymore and her date the Kool-Aid Man, the Greased-Up Deaf Guy, the Evil Monkey, David Bowie, and the Griffin family attending. Everyone goes into the theatre where Channel 5 reveals they have hired Glenn Quagmire to provide them with a bootleg copy of the film. We then see an advertisement for a new movie, People Who Look Like They Never Sleep..., starring Susan Sarandon and Vince Vaughn, and another film, The Littlest Bunny, made by Disney and featuring music by Randy Newman. After this, the film begins.

Stewie B. Goode
When the Griffins go swimming at the Quahog Community Pool, Peter tries teaching Stewie to swim and manages to throw  him into the pool, despite Stewie begging to be put down. Lois takes Stewie to swimming lessons, after Stewie nearly drowns, where Stewie meets Brad, a child about his age who is the "Star Swimmer." In jealousy, Stewie does everything he can to steal Brad's glory. As a last resort he tries to kill him by rigging a lifeguard chair with dynamite and luring Brad beneath it with marzipan; however, Stewie's detonator malfunctions, blowing up the legs of the chair and causing it to fall on Stewie, presumbably killing him. He ends up in Hell with Steve Allen. When Stewie is revived by Lois, he believes it is a sign for him to be a good boy.

After Peter learns that the new video store will not let him rent pornography, he vents his frustration in front of newscaster Tom Tucker, who gives him a job at Quahog 5 hosting a segment called "What Really Grinds My Gears", in which he rants about things that bother him. Peter becomes extremely popular, eventually overshadowing Tucker, who is fired after attempting to distract Peter during filming.

Stewie attempts to be a good boy by smothering Brian with affection. Brian finally goads Stewie into reverting to his old, violent ways by crushing a spider web and eating the spider. Stewie starts drinking heavily, following Brian's way of coping. Brian attempts to cure Stewie of his alcoholism by taking him out for a night of drinking at the Drunken Clam. While drunk, Stewie crashes Brian's car through the wall of the bar. Knowing Stewie is Peter's son, Tom takes advantage of the situation and presents footage of the accident at the news station. Peter is fired and Tom is rehired as the anchor. The next morning, Stewie has a hangover and realizes his lonely existence in the world, wishing that there were someone else to whom he could relate. At the end, Stewie says it is good that he stopped drinking now, so that it would not have any repercussions later in life.

Bango Was His Name, Oh!
Peter buys a TiVo. While watching it, Stewie spots a man in San Francisco on the news that has the same face and hairstyle as him. Stewie then believes that he may be his true father. After several failed attempts to raise money for a plane ticket and learning that Quagmire is going on a cross-country tour in which he plans to have sex with a different woman in every state of America (and Vegas), Brian and Stewie hitch a ride in his RV. At a motel in New Jersey, Quagmire is handcuffed to a bed and mugged by the latest woman. Then Stewie and Brian drive off with his RV, leaving Quagmire at the motel.

Meanwhile, Peter and Lois are trying to get intimate, but are constantly interrupted by Chris and Meg. To solve this problem, Peter and Lois decide to teach the children how to find dates. After several "lessons", Peter and Lois send them to the mall. However, Lois is concerned that people will think they're bad parents simply because they wanted their children out of the way so they can be together.

Stewie crashes the RV in the desert after going insane from ingesting an entire bottle of "West Coast Turnarounds". After wandering through the desert, Stewie breaks down crying and nearly decides to give up until Brian encourages him to keep going. The two manage to get a rental car and arrive in San Francisco. Stewie mysteriously leaves Brian and confronts the man from TV on a cable car, and is shocked to discover that the man is actually himself from 30 years in the future.

Stu and Stewie's Excellent Adventure
"Stu", as Stewie's future self is called, tells Stewie that he is on vacation (Stu explains that rather than just simply travel to different places in the world, people from his time travel to other time periods). Stu reveals he cannot tell anyone about his time, but when he leaves for his time, Stewie stows away with him. Stewie learns he will not become ruler of the world but rather "a 35-year-old Parade magazine-reading virgin". Stewie is further disappointed when, doing a family dinner, he learns Lois is still alive, Meg underwent a sex change shortly after college and is now called Ron, Chris is a cop married to a foul-mouthed chain-smoking woman called Vanessa whose only interest is sticking Lois and Peter into a retirement home so she can have their house, and that Brian died after eating chocolate out of the garbage and is seen in Heaven with Ernest Hemingway, Vincent van Gogh and Kurt Cobain, who all shot themselves. Stu passes off Stewie as a Nicaraguan boy named Pablo to everyone until Stu can send him back to his own time.

Stewie learns he will work at the Quahog Circuit Shack while living with Rupert, his childhood teddy bear, in a filthy apartment. Disgusted with the way his life will turn out, Stewie remodels Stu's apartment and gets him to lose his virginity to his co-worker, Fran (though he spends more time crying than having sex). The next day, Fran tells everyone about the humiliating experience, costing Stu his job for having relations with a co-worker. Returning home, he finds that his apartment is on fire due to the stress-relieving candles Stewie put there. With his life now ruined, Stu laments the day of his near-death experience at the community pool, revealing that, despite Stewie's earlier ascertation that the incident would have no impact on his life, memories of the experience will re-surface when Stewie is 20 years old, causing him to repress most of his major emotions and preventing him from taking any risks.

They visit Lois (who reveals that she had recognized "Pablo" as her "little Stewie" immediately) at a retirement home for a loan and get a new time travel watch, which she agrees to on the condition that Stewie travels back in time to Chris and Vanessa's wedding and kill her as a favor. After saying goodbye to Stu, Stewie travels to the day of the accident (after fulfilling Lois' favor) and prevents himself from getting crushed by the chair. However, future Stewie gets vaporized by present Stewie, thus creating a paradox and skipping the formalities of Future Stewie disappearing eventually. In the bleachers at the pool, Meg is seen talking to a man named Ron, admitting she likes the name.

Ending

At the end Tricia Takanawa talks with the fans and asks them how they liked the film, receiving completely negative feedback. After this, Tricia asks the family what they did during the show's cancellation between Seasons 3 and 4. Peter talks about how he did several part-time jobs that involved wearing costumes, although he always wound up fired because he kept peeing in them because he thought it was like an astronaut suit, but when he finally did become an astronaut, he did not believe he had to pee in the suit and almost died. Brian talks about how he met his fans and competed in the Iditarod Dog Race, only to get very tired and lose. Lois talks about how she became a prostitute and shows video footage of her trying to beat up a policeman and of her having an argument in a convenience store over her wanting to taste the chips. Meg talks about entertaining the U.S. Navy by singing and dressing like Cher for "If I Could Turn Back Time". However, she was actually repulsing the sailors instead, causing them to abandon and sink the ship they were on. Stewie talks about his appearances in those "damn" talk shows. Chris then talks about his guest appearance on The West Wing.

In the end, during his final speech, Peter rips out a fart as a joke, prompting everyone to laugh. The screen pulls back, revealing it to be on another TV screen with Peter next to it. He explains that over 300 million Americans pass gas each day. He also tells the viewers to "visit my ass" for more information. Peter then rips out another fart as a joke, thus ending the movie.

Cast

 Seth MacFarlane as Stewie Griffin, Peter Griffin, Brian Griffin, Glenn Quagmire, Tom Tucker, Stuart "Stu" Griffin, Bugs Bunny, and Kool-Aid Man
 Alex Borstein as Lois Griffin, Tricia Takanawa, Vanessa Griffin, Condoleezza Rice, Ann Curry, and Diane Sawyer
 Seth Green as Chris Griffin and Neil Goldman
 Mila Kunis as Meg Griffin and Sexy Girls
 Patrick Warburton as Joe Swanson
 Lori Alan as Diane Simmons and Drunk Lady
 Drew Barrymore as herself
 Mike Henry as Cleveland Brown, Mr. John Herbert, Bruce and Fred Rogers
 Rachael MacFarlane as Katie Couric, Britney Spears, Luanne Platter, and Muriel Goldman
 Noel Blanc as Elmer Fudd
 Phil LaMarr as Ollie Williams, Judge of Quahog, and Al Roker
 Adam West as Mayor West
 Ali Hillis as Meg Griffin singing "If I Could Turn Back Time"
 Busy Philipps as Additional voices
 Jason Priestley as Brandon Walsh
 Jennie Garth as Kelly Taylor
 Tori Spelling as Donna Martin
 Rory Thost as Brad and Casper the Friendly Ghost
 Michael Clarke Duncan as the Stork
 Will Sasso as Randy Newman and James Lipton
 Kevin Michael Richardson as Young Ray Charles
 Danny Smith as The Evil Monkey who lives in the Closet, Rupert, and Al Harrington
 John Viener as Ron Griffin, Joe Pesci and Boomhauer
 René Auberjonois as Odo
 Joy Behar as Herself
 Johnny Brennan as Horace
 Bill Fagerbakke as Change For A Buck
 Larry Kenney as Lion-O
 Don LaFontaine as FOX Announcer
 Lynne Lipton as Cheetara

Reception 

The A.V. Club called it "uneven but frequently hilarious". Several reviewers criticised the film for being too long to sustain interest.

Controversy
The episode when broadcast in Canada was subject to a complaint to the Canadian Broadcast Standards Council in 2011. The council ordered that Global Television must apologize to its viewers for not warning them about the violence in a scene where Elmer Fudd kills Bugs Bunny with a rifle during a July 23, 2011 airing of the Family Guy episode "Stewie B. Goode". The Council stated "The panel finds that the scene was definitely somewhat gruesome and uncomfortable to watch. It recognizes, however, that the scene was intended to satirize the violence found in that type of cartoon program. The gag was somewhat tongue-in-cheek since Family Guy itself is an animated program that sometimes contains violence".

See also

References

External links

 
 
 
 

Family Guy publications
2005 direct-to-video films
2005 comedy films
2005 science fiction films
2005 films
American science fiction comedy films
American animated comedy films
American adult animated films
Direct-to-video animated films
Films based on television series
Films set in San Francisco
Films set in the San Francisco Bay Area
Films set in Rhode Island
Animated films about time travel
20th Century Fox direct-to-video films
2006 American television episodes
Films about dysfunctional families
2000s American animated films
American direct-to-video films
Older versions of cartoon characters
American black comedy films
20th Century Fox animated films
Fox Television Animation films
Fuzzy Door Productions films
Cultural depictions of Walt Disney
Cultural depictions of Ernest Hemingway
Cultural depictions of Vincent van Gogh
Cultural depictions of Britney Spears
Films about families
Family Guy (season 4) episodes
2000s English-language films